Alexandru Petrișor Chioseaua (born 29 September 1997) is a Romanian rower. He competed in the men's eight event at the 2020 Summer Olympics.

References

External links
 

1997 births
Living people
Romanian male rowers
Olympic rowers of Romania
Rowers at the 2020 Summer Olympics
Place of birth missing (living people)